Galileo Ferraris was one of four s built for the  (Royal Italian Navy) during the early 1930s. She played a minor role in the Spanish Civil War of 1936–1939 supporting the Spanish Nationalists.

Design and description
The Archimede class was an improved and enlarged version of the earlier . They displaced  surfaced and  submerged. They had an operational diving depth of  Their crew numbered 55 officers and enlisted men.

For surface running, the boats were powered by two  diesel engines, each driving one propeller shaft. When submerged each propeller was driven by a  electric motor. They could reach  on the surface and  underwater.

The boats were armed with eight  torpedo tubes, four each in the bow and in the stern for which they carried a total of 16 torpedoes. They were also armed with a pair of  deck guns, one each fore and aft of the conning tower, for combat on the surface. Their anti-aircraft armament consisted of two single  machine guns.

Construction and career
Gaileo Ferraris was laid down by Cantieri navali Tosi di Taranto at their Taranto shipyard in 1931, launched on 11 August 1934 and completed the following year.
Killed aboard the ship was the French Communist Deputy Marcel Basset. Three days later, she hit the 2,762 GRT cargo ship  with a single torpedo. The ship was beached to prevent her from sinking and became a constructive total loss.

Notes

Bibliography 
 
 

uboat.net Galileo Ferraris (FE, I.32) Ferraris Accessed 2 May 2022

External links
 Galileo Ferraris (1934) Marina Militare website

Archimede-class submarines
World War II submarines of Italy
1934 ships
Ships built by Cantieri navali Tosi di Taranto
Ships built in Taranto